Rex Norris may refer to:
 Rex Norris (American football) (born 1939), American football coach
 Rex Norris (field hockey) (1899–1980), Indian Olympic field hockey player